Cotaena is a genus of sedge moths originally described by Francis Walker in 1865.

Taxonomy
The genus was originally described in the Aegeriidae (=Sesiidae), transferred to the Heliodinidae by Edward Meyrick, to the Schreckensteiniidae by Thomas Bainbrigge Fletcher, to the Heliodinidae by Clas Michael Naumann and finally to the Glyphipterigidae by John B. Heppner and W. Donald Duckworth.

Species
Cotaena magnifica Sohn & Heppner, 2015 (from Brazil)
Cotaena mediana Walker, 1864 (Amazon basin)
Cotaena plenella (Busck, 1914) (from Panama)
Cotaena phlegyropa (Meyrick, 1915) (from Guyana and French Guiana)
Cotaena tchalla Sohn & Heppner, 2015 (from Brazil)

References

Sohn & Heppner, 2015. Two new Species of Cotaena Walker (Lepidoptera: Glyphipterigidae) from Brazil. Tropical Lepidoptera Research, 25(1): 5-7, 2015

External links
 Cotaena mediana at Zipcodezoo.com

Glyphipterigidae